Maghull is a civil parish and a town in Sefton, Merseyside, England.  It contains ten buildings that are recorded in the National Heritage List for England as designated listed buildings.   Of these, one is listed at Grade II*, the middle of the three grades, and the others are at Grade II, the lowest grade.

The town developed after the arrival of the railway in 1849 and has become a dormitory town for Liverpool.  In the late 19th and early 20th century a number of homes for the care of people suffering from epilepsy, and three of the houses used for this purpose are listed, namely, Chapel House, Manor House, and Harrison Home, the last being specially built for the purpose.  The other listed buildings include structures associated with these houses, a church, a ruined chapel, and a memorial.

Key

Buildings

References
Citations

Sources

Listed buildings in Merseyside
Lists of listed buildings in Merseyside
Listed buildings